Sovetskoye is a rural locality (a selo) and the administrative center of Sovetskoye Rural Settlement, Kalacheyevsky District, Voronezh Oblast, Russia. The population was 432 as of 2010. There are 5 streets.

Geography 
Sovetskoye is located 37 km southeast of Kalach (the district's administrative centre) by road. Kolos is the nearest rural locality.

References 

Rural localities in Kalacheyevsky District